Calyciphora golestanica is a moth of the family Pterophoridae. It is found in Golestan, Iran.

References

Moths described in 2005
Pterophorini
Moths of the Middle East